Nobody Has to Know is a 2021 drama film written and directed by Bouli Lanners. The film stars Michelle Fairley, Bouli Lanners, Cal MacAninch, Clovis Cornillac, and Julian Glover. It follows Philippe Haubin, an aging man dealing with his progressing dementia with the help of a deceptive woman, Millie MacPherson.

The film had its world premiere at the 2021 Toronto International Film Festival. At the 12th Magritte Awards, Nobody Has to Know received seven nominations, winning Best Film and Best Director for Lanners.

References

External links
 

2021 films
2021 drama films
Belgian drama films
British drama films
French drama films
Films directed by Bouli Lanners
Films about dementia
Magritte Award winners